Vernon Murray Spencer (February 4, 1894 – June 3, 1971) was a  Major League Baseball outfielder. Spencer played for the New York Giants in the  season. In 45 career games, he had 28 hits in 140 at-bats. He batted left and threw right-handed.

He was tried for murder in Sault St. Marie, Ontario, Canada and was acquitted.

Spencer was born and died in Wixom, Michigan.

References

External links

1894 births
1971 deaths
New York Giants (NL) players
Baseball players from Michigan
Sportspeople from Oakland County, Michigan
Pontiac Indians players
Mt. Clemens Bathers players